Grandma's Boy is a 1922 family comedy film starring Harold Lloyd.  The film was highly influential, helping to pioneer feature-length comedies which combined gags with character development. This film was also an immensely popular, commercially successful film in its time.

Plot
The grandma's boy is a timid coward who cannot muster courage to woo his girl and is afraid of his rival. His loving grandma gives him a magic charm from the Civil War that had been used by his grandfather, which gives him the courage to capture a town criminal and win the girl. The "magic charm" turns out to be the handle of her umbrella and his grandma was pretending it was magical all along.

Cast
 Harold Lloyd - Grandma's Boy / Grandfather
 Mildred Davis - His Girl
 Anna Townsend - Grandma
 Dick Sutherland - The Rolling Stone
 Charles Stevenson - His Rival / Union General
 Noah Young - Sheriff

See also
 Harold Lloyd filmography

References

External links

 
 
 

1922 films
American silent feature films
1922 comedy films
American black-and-white films
American Civil War films
Films directed by Fred C. Newmeyer
Hal Roach Studios short films
Silent American comedy films
Articles containing video clips
Films with screenplays by H. M. Walker
Films with screenplays by Sam Taylor (director)
Associated Exhibitors films
1920s English-language films
1920s American films